The Geisingberg is a striking basalt mountain in the eastern Ore Mountains in the German federal state of Saxony.

Location and surrounding area 
The Geisingberg lies in the upper Eastern Ore Mountains between the mining town of Altenberg and the village of Geising. On its northern and western slopes runs the track of the Müglitz Valley Railway. With a maximum incline here of 1:27 (37 per mil) it is one of the steepest working railway lines in Germany.

Walking routes to the summit 
 The easiest ascent runs from Altenberg along the road to the summit.
 Other walks being in Geising and Bärenstein.
 The Eisenach–Budapest international mountain path runs over the Geisingberg.

See also 
 List of mountains in the Ore Mountains
 The Gaising (Latvian: Gaiziņkalns), the highest point in Latvia.

References

External links 

 Information about the Geisingberg Nature Reserve
 Homepage of the Bergbaude Geisingberg (with information about its history and geology)

Sächsische Schweiz-Osterzgebirge
Towers in Germany
Mountains of the Ore Mountains
Mountains under 1000 metres
Altenberg, Saxony
Nature reserves in Saxony